Karlen Mkrtchyan (born 25 November 1988) is an Armenian former professional footballer who played as a midfielder.

Career

Club

Pyunik
Karlen Mkrtchyan is a graduate the Armenian football club school Pyunik Yerevan. Since 2007, he played for the first team. In the 2008 Armenian Premier League he played in all 28 games, and also took part in the final match against Ararat Yerevan, in which Pyunik won the Premier League. With Mkrtchyan as a member, Pyunik won the Armenian Premier League in 2007, 2008, 2009, 2010, the Armenian Cup in 2009 and 2010 and the Armenian Supercup in 2007, 2008 and 2010.

On 10 January 2011, it was reported that Karlen went to preseason camp in Turkey with Kuban Krasnodar. Together with Mkrtchyan on interest of Kuban was national teammate Gevorg Ghazaryan. In the test match against Astana Locomotive, Mkrtchyan was seriously hurt damaged, resulting in a surgery.

Metalurh Donetsk
On 1 April 2011, Mkrtchyan signed a contract with Metalurh Donetsk for three years. Following a vote held at the official site of Donetsk Metalurh, Mkrtchyan was voted the best player of the club in October, November and December 2011.

Anzhi Makhachkala
On 30 August 2013, Mkrtchyan signed for Russian Premier League side Anzhi Makhachkala.

Tobol
On 9 January 2015, Mkrtchyan signed a one-year contract with Kazakhstan Premier League side FC Tobol, leaving the club on 22 April of the same year through mutual consent. Following his release from Tobol, Mkrtchyan trained with FC Pyunik.

Anzhi Makhachkala
On 26 June 2015, Mkrtchyan signed a three-year contract to return to Anzhi Makhachkala.

On 31 January 2017, Anzhi removed him from their Russian Premier League roster.

Pyunik
On 17 August 2017, Mkrtchyan signed a one-year contract with his former club Pyunik of the Armenian Premier League. On 2 July 2020, Pyunik announced that Mkrtchyan had left the club after his contract had expired.

International career
Since joining Pyunik he began to be involved in 2008 in the Armenia U-21 team that in a home game, he scored his first goal for the youth national team and the first goal of the match against the Turkey U-21 team. Armenia defeated Turkey 2–1. Since 2008, plays for the senior Armenia national football team. The first match held on 2 February 2008 in Malta's capital Valletta, against the local national team. The match ended 1–0 in favor of the Armenian team. Mkrtchyan scored his first goal for the Armenia national team on 14 November 2012 in a home friendly match against Lithuania at the 50th minute. Armenia defeated Lithuania 4–2.

Personal life
Following the 14 November 2012 Armenian national game, in which Mkrtchyan scored his first goal for the team, he headed back to Donetsk together with his wife and got married. His wife was a classmate of fellow Metalurh and Armenian national player Gevorg Ghazaryan.

Career statistics

Club

International
Scores and results list Armenia's goal tally first, score column indicates score after each Mkrtchyan goal.

Honours
Pyunik Yerevan
Armenian Premier League: 2007, 2008, 2009, 2010
Armenian Cup: 2009, 2010
Armenian Supercup: 2007, 2008, 2010

Individual
Armenian Footballer of the Year: 2010
Metalurh Donetsk Player of the Month: October 2011, November 2011, December 2011
Metalurh Donetsk Player of First Half of Season: 2012–13
Metalurh Donetsk Best Foreign Player: 2012

References

External links
 
 Profile at FFA
 
 armfootball.tripod.com
 
 
 

1988 births
Living people
Footballers from Yerevan
Armenian footballers
Association football midfielders
Armenia international footballers
Armenia under-21 international footballers
FC Pyunik players
FC Metalurh Donetsk players
FC Anzhi Makhachkala players
FC Tobol players
Armenian Premier League players
Ukrainian Premier League players
Russian Premier League players
Kazakhstan Premier League players
Armenian expatriate footballers
Armenian expatriate sportspeople in Ukraine
Expatriate footballers in Ukraine
Armenian expatriate sportspeople in Russia
Expatriate footballers in Russia
Armenian expatriate sportspeople in Kazakhstan
Expatriate footballers in Kazakhstan